Marco Moscati (born 1 November 1992) is an Italian footballer who plays as a midfielder for  club Südtirol.

Club career
He made his professional debut in the Serie B for Livorno on 29 May 2011 in a game against Frosinone.

Perugia

Loan to Trapani
On 2 September 2019, he joined Trapani on loan.

Südtirol
On 3 August 2021, he joined  Südtirol as a free agent.

References

External links
 

1992 births
Living people
Sportspeople from Livorno
Italian footballers
Association football midfielders
Serie B players
Serie C players
U.S. Livorno 1915 players
A.C. Perugia Calcio players
Virtus Entella players
Novara F.C. players
Trapani Calcio players
F.C. Südtirol players
Footballers from Tuscany